Paracalyptrophora is a genus of corals belonging to the family Primnoidae.

The species of this genus are found in Pacific and Atlantic Ocean.

Species:

Paracalyptrophora carinata 
Paracalyptrophora duplex 
Paracalyptrophora echinata 
Paracalyptrophora enigma 
Paracalyptrophora hawaiiensis 
Paracalyptrophora josephinae 
Paracalyptrophora kerberti 
Paracalyptrophora mariae 
Paracalyptrophora simplex 
Paracalyptrophora spiralis

References

Primnoidae
Octocorallia genera